Michaela Schanze (born 30 March 1973) is a German female handball player. She was a member of the Germany women's national handball team. She was part of the  team at the 1996 Summer Olympics, playing two matches. On club level she played for VfB Leipzig in Leipzig.

References

Living people
Handball players at the 1996 Summer Olympics
1973 births
German female handball players
Olympic handball players of Germany
People from Zwickau
Sportspeople from Saxony